Vinokino is an annual lesbian and gay film festival in Finland.

Name 
The name of the festival, Vinokino, is a compound noun meaning "slanted" or "tilted cinema", emphasising the fact that the festival gives through its selection of films a non-straight slant on relationships and culture.

History 
The festival started in 1991 in the southwestern city of Turku. In 2001, the festival spread to Helsinki, the Finnish capital.

Operations 
It now offers the same program in both cities and, moreover, shows smaller selections of films in the cities of Jyväskylä, Oulu and Tampere. The festival has its headquarters in Turku, which is also where the screenings start every year. The festival takes place from October to November, and usually lasts three days in each city.

Vinokino is the only film festival in Finland exclusively presenting gay and lesbian films. The program typically consists of a number of feature films, some documentaries, and at least two selections of short films. All films are either in English or subtitled in English.

See also
List of LGBT film festivals

External links 
 Official Vinokino website

Recurring events established in 1991
Film festivals in Finland
Festivals in Helsinki
LGBT events in Finland
LGBT film festivals
1991 establishments in Finland
Autumn events in Finland
LGBT festivals in Europe